Nicolas Jeanjean (born 13 March 1981 in Montpellier, France) was a French rugby union footballer, who played for CA Brive in the Top 14. His usual position was at a Fullback. Prior to joining CA Brive he played for Stade Toulousain and Stade Français. He made his debut for France on 16 June 2001 against South Africa.

Honours 
 Grand Slam: 2002
 Top 14: 2000–01 with Stade Toulousain, 2006–07 with Stade Français

References

External links

Nicolas Jeanjean

1981 births
Living people
French rugby union players
Stade Toulousain players
Stade Français players
France international rugby union players
CA Brive players
Sportspeople from Montpellier
Rugby union fullbacks